The province of Isabela has 1,055 barangays comprising its 34 municipalities and 3 cities.

Barangays

References

 01
Isabela